Seamen's Hospital was originally opened by Dr Peter Young, a surgeon of the Honourable East India Company in 1843 during the First Opium War.

History
The hospital was financially supported by Jardine Matheson and Company in Wan Chai, Colonial Hong Kong under the British Royal Navy. The facility was closed in 1873 due to financial difficulties.

The Royal Naval Hospital later replaced the Seaman's Hospital.

References

See also
 Tung Wah Hospital
 HMS Tamar
 HMS Minden

Defunct hospitals in Hong Kong
Military of Hong Kong under British rule
Demolished buildings and structures in China
Hospitals established in 1843
1873 disestablishments in Hong Kong
1843 establishments in Hong Kong